HSCP may refer to:

 Health and Social Care Partnership
 Health Services Collegiate Program, at United States Navy Health Care
 Harvard Studies in Classical Philology (or HSCPh).